The 1985 Sam Houston State Bearkats football team represented Sam Houston State University as a member of the Gulf Star Conference (GSC) during the 1985 NCAA Division I-AA football season. Led by fourth-year head coach Ron Randleman, the Bearkats compiled an overall record of 8–3 with a mark of 4–1 in conference play, and finished as co-champion in the GSC.

Schedule

References

Sam Houston State
Sam Houston Bearkats football seasons
Sam Houston State Bearkats football